Blethisa hudsonica is a species of ground beetle in the family Carabidae. It is found in Europe and Northern Asia (excluding China) and North America.

References

Further reading

 
 
 
 

Blethisa
Beetles described in 1924